The Shekerley Mountains are a low mountain range on southwestern Antigua island, in the nation of Antigua and Barbuda and the Leeward Islands of the eastern Caribbean.

Geography
The range stretches for  along the south coast of the island, from near Johnsons Point in the west, to Falmouth Harbour and Falmouth, near English Harbour in the east.

Prominent hills
All of the highest points on Antigua island are in the Shekerley Mountains range. 

The most prominent hills of the Shekerley Mountains include: 
 Boggy Peak, the highest and formerly named Mount Obama
 Monks Hill
 Signal Hill
 Sage Hill

See also
 
 

Landforms of Antigua and Barbuda
Antigua (island)
Mountain ranges of the Caribbean